Kazakh literature is defined as 'the body of literature, both oral and written, produced in the Kazakh language by the Kazakh people of Central Asia'.

Kazakh literature expands from the current territory of Kazakhstan, also including the era of Kazakh Soviet Socialist Republic, Kazakh recognized territory under the Russian Empire and the Kazakh Khanate.  There is some overlap with several complementary themes, including the literature of Turkic tribes that inhabited Kazakhstan over the course of the history and literature written by ethnic Kazakhs.

Medieval literature 
According to Chinese written sources of 6th-8th centuries CE, Turkic tribes of Kazakhstan had oral poetry tradition. These came from earlier periods, and were primarily transmitted by bards: professional storytellers and musical performers. Traces of this tradition are shown on Orkhon script stone carvings dated 5th-7th centuries CE that describe rule of Kultegin and Bilge, two early Turkic rulers ("kagans"). Amongst the Kazakhs, the bard was a primarily, though not exclusively, male profession. Since at least the 17th century, Kazakh bards could be divided in two main categories: the zhıraws (zhiraus, žyraus), who passed on the works of others, usually not creating and adding their own original work; and the aqyns (akyns), who improvised or created their own poems, stories or songs. There were several types of works, such as didactic termes, elegiac tolgaws, and epic zhırs.

Although the origins of such tales are often unknown, most of them were associated with bards of the recent or more distant past, who supposedly created them or passed them on, by the time most Kazakh poetry and prose was first written down in the second half of the 19th century. There are clear stylistic differences between works first created in the 19th century, and works dating from earlier periods but not documented before the 19th century, such as those attributed to such 16th- and 17th-century bards as Er Shoban and Dosmombet Zhıraw (also known as Dospambet Žyrau; he appeared to have been literate, and reportedly visited Constantinople), and even to such 15th-century bards as Shalkiz and Asan Qayghı. Other notable bards include Kaztugan Žyrau, Žiembet Žyrau, Axtamberdy Žyrau, and Buxar Žyrau Kalkamanuly, who was an advisor to Ablai Khan, and whose works have been preserved by Mäšhür Žüsip Köpeev. Er Targhın and Alpamıs are two of the most famous examples of Kazakh literature to be recorded in the 19th century.

The Book of Dede Korkut and Oguz Name (a story of ancient Turkic king Oghuz Khan) are the most well-known Turkic heroic legends. Initially created around 9th century CE, they were passed on through generations in oral form. The legendary tales were recorded by Turkish authors in 14-16th centuries C.E.

Modern literature

Abai Qunanbaiuly 

The preeminent role in the development of modern literary Kazakh belongs to Abai Qunanbaiuly (sometimes russified to Abay Kunanbayev, Абай Кунанбаев) (1845–1904), whose writings did much to preserve Kazakh folk culture. Abai's major work is The Book of Words, a philosophical treatise and collection of poems where he criticizes Russian colonial policies and encourages other Kazakhs to embrace education and literacy.

Ay Qap and Qazaq 
The literary magazines Ay Qap (published between 1911 and 1915 in Arabic script) and Qazaq (published between 1913 and 1918) played an important role in the development of the intellectual and political life among early 20th-century Kazakhs.

Translated Works 
In 2021, the government of Kazakhstan funded the translation of 100 famous international pieces of literature and textbooks into the Kazakh language. Translated works include topics from the humanities, best-selling modern classics, economics & social science textbooks, and more.

See also 
Writers' Union of Kazakhstan

References

Further reading